Valerio Varesi is an Italian author of crime novels. So far six of his novels have been published in English, the first two of which were shortlisted for the CWA International Dagger. His novels have all been bestsellers in the original Italian.  He is a journalist with La Repubblica.

Bibliography

Books published in English:

River of Shadows
The Dark Valley
Gold, Frankincense and Dust
A Woman Much Missed
The Lizard Strategy
The Unseen

The Book Depository

References

External links
River of Shadows by Valerio Varesi, Quercus Press
The Unseen by Valerio Varesi, Patrician Press

Italian crime fiction writers
Italian male writers
Year of birth missing (living people)
Living people